Robert Ménard is a Canadian film director and screenwriter. He is most noted for his 1982 film A Day in a Taxi (Une journée en taxi), for which he was a Genie Award nominee for Best Director at the 4th Genie Awards in 1983.

His other films have included Exit, Cruising Bar, You're Beautiful, Jeanne (T'es belle Jeanne), Love Crazy (Amoureux fou), Water Child (L'enfant d'eau), Cruising Bar 2, A Happy Man (Le Bonheur de Pierre) and Stay with Me (Reste avec moi).

He was married to Claire Wojas, his screenwriting collaborator on nearly all of his films, until her death in 2018.

References

External links

20th-century Canadian screenwriters
21st-century Canadian screenwriters
Canadian screenwriters in French
Canadian male screenwriters
Film directors from Quebec
Writers from Quebec
French Quebecers
Living people
Year of birth missing (living people)